Lara Schulze (born 21 May 2002) is a German chess Woman International Master (WIM, 2021) who German Women's Chess Championship (2022).

Biography 
At the age of eight, Schulze learned to play chess with SK Lehrte. In the Chess Women's Bundesliga Season 2013/14 she played for the first time. In the years that followed, she became German chess champion and European chess champion several times in her respective age group.

At the FIDE Online Chess Olympiad 2020 and the FIDE Online Chess Olympiad 2021 Schulze played for the German national chess team. Together with Elisabeth Pähtz and Josefine Heinemann she runs the Twitch channel Women's Chess Experts.

In 2021 Schulze switched to SV Werder Bremen and is coached there by Jonathan Carlstedt and Dmitrij Kollars. She is the only woman part of the Bremen squad for the Chess Bundesliga Season 2021/22.

Schulze did his Abitur at the Gymnasium Lehrte in 2021. She lives in Hanover.

Achievements 
 2014: German Chess Champion (U12, girls)
 2015: German Chess Champion (U14, girls)
 2016: European Chess Champion (U14, girls)
 2016: Women's FIDE Master (WFM)
 2017: German Chess Champion (U16, girls)
 2018: German Chess Champion (U16, girls)
 2019: German Chess Champion (U18, girls)
 2019: FIDE Master (FM)
 2021: European Chess Champion (U20, girls)
 2021: German Women's Rapid Chess Champion
 2021: Woman International Master (WIM)
 2022: German Chess Champion
 2022: German Rapid Chess Champion

References

External links 

Lara Schulze's website
FM Lara Schulze at Lichess

2002 births
Living people
Chess Woman International Masters
German female chess players
Chess coaches